Marock is the 2005 Moroccan film by director Laïla Marrakchi. The film was 2006's most successful film in Morocco, taking more than 3 million dirhams at the Moroccan box-office, according to TelQuel. It was very controversial as it deals with a Muslim-Jewish romantic relationship between two young people in Casablanca, Morocco, Rita and Youri.

The film was shown in Moroccan cinemas without being edited or censored.  The title Marock is a play on words based on the French name for Morocco, Maroc, and rock as in rock 'n' roll. It was screened in the Un Certain Regard section at the 2005 Cannes Film Festival.

Cast
 Morjana Alaoui – Rita Belghiti
 Matthieu Boujenah – Youri Benchekri
 Razika Simozrag – Asmaa
 Fatym Layachi – Sofia
 Assaad Bouab – Mao
 Rachid Benhaissan – Driss
 Khalid Maadour – Omar
 Michael Souda – Mehdi

Critical reception
The film received 3 stars out of 4 from the critic Alain Spira in Paris Match: "Marrakchi depicts, in an original way, the young jet set of her country. [...] Hypocritical religion, arranged marriages, the Judeo-Arab rivalry, nothing is spared. But Marock is also a great cry of love for her country with its generous spirit and matchless style for living."

References

Notes

External links
 
 Official website (site offline, 5 December 2008)
 

2005 films
French drama films
2000s Arabic-language films
Films about Moroccan Jews
Films directed by Laïla Marrakchi
2005 drama films
Moroccan drama films
2000s French films